Small Radios Big Televisions is an indie puzzle video game. The game was developed by Fire Face and released on 8 November 2016 for PC and PlayStation 4. Owen Deery, the founder of Fire Face, created everything in the game, including artwork, music and a custom game engine.

The game initially started out as a free web-based prototype using WebGL and JavaScript. When the prototype attracted significant interest, Owen decided to turn it into a stand-alone game.

Reception 

Small Radios Big Televisions received mixed reviews from critics upon release. On Metacritic, the game holds scores of 67/100 for the PC version based on 7 reviews, and 62/100 for the PlayStation 4 version based on 15 reviews.

The game received praise from critics for the unique atmosphere created by its visuals and music. The music style has been likened to Boards of Canada, which was also cited as inspiration by Owen. Several reviews voiced their dislike for the unvaried puzzles and confusing story.

References

External links 
 
 Original web-based game prototype

2016 video games
Puzzle video games
PlayStation 4 games
Indie video games
Exploration video games
Video games developed in Canada
Adult Swim games
Single-player video games
Windows games